Notre-Dame de la Mouise is a 1941 Dutch-French film directed by Robert Péguy.

Cast
Édouard Delmont	... 	Le père Didier (as Delmont)
François Rozet	... 	L'abbé
Georges Rollin	... 	Bibi
René Sarvil	... 	Julot (as Sarvil)
Champi	... 	Nénesse
Rivers Cadet	... 	Monsieur Eugène
Rolla Norman		
Henri de Livry		(as De Livry)
René Alié		
René Lefevre-Bel		
François Rodon	... 	Gosse de Pou
Félix Claude		
Odette Joyeux	... 	La môme
Odette Barencey	... 	Zéphyrine (as Odette Barancey)
Solange Varennes	... 	La Sauterelle

External links 
 

1941 films
Dutch black-and-white films
French black-and-white films
Dutch drama films
French drama films
1940s French-language films
1940s French films